Robert Reuven Sokal (January 13, 1926 in Vienna, Austria – April 9, 2012 in Stony Brook, New York) was an Austrian-American biostatistician and entomologist. Distinguished Professor Emeritus at the Stony Brook University, Sokal was a member of the National Academy of Sciences and the American Academy of Arts and Sciences. He promoted the use of statistics in biology and co-founded the field of numerical taxonomy, together with Peter H. A. Sneath.

Life
Robert Sokal was born in 1926 in a Jewish family in Vienna, Austria. In 1939, following the annexation of Austria by Nazi Germany, he escaped with his family to China. He earned his bachelor's degree at St. John's College in Shanghai, where he married, and from there moved with his wife Julie to the University of Chicago, where he also worked as a librarian to complement his scholarship. He took his Ph.D. degree under the supervision of the well-known termite systematist Alfred E. Emerson. He was also strongly influenced by Sewall Wright, who served on his dissertation committee. Sokal developed an interest for statistics and quantitative biology.

In 1959, Sokal moved to the University of Kansas where he developed—initially in collaboration with Charles Duncan Michener—quantitative techniques for classifying organisms and building dendrograms, which later came to be called numerical taxonomy methods. At the State University of New York, Stony Brook, in collaboration with F. James Rohlf, Sokal worked on new statistical methods for the analysis of geographic variation. His interests shifted to anthropology and population genetics, and he directed studies on the population history of Europe as inferred from genetic and ethnohistorical data. Along with Luca Cavalli-Sforza, Sokal pioneered the comparative study of linguistic and genetic variation.

Awards and honors
 Fellow, American Association for the Advancement of Science, 1983
 Fellow, American Academy of Arts and Sciences, 1986
 Guggenheim Fellowship, 1975, 1983
 Member, United States National Academy of Sciences, 1987
 Doctor of Science (honorary), University of Crete, Iraklion, 1990
 Distinguished Statistical Ecologist Award, International Association for Ecology, 1994
 Darwin Lifetime Achievement Award, American Association of Physical Anthropologists, 2004

Works

Selected scientific bibliography (original articles)

 Sokal R.R. (1988) "Genetic, geographic, and linguistic distances in Europe." Proceedings of the National Academy of Sciences USA 85:1722-1726. 
 Barbujani G. and Sokal R.R. (1990) "Zones of sharp genetic change in Europe are also linguistic boundaries."  Proceedings of the National Academy of Sciences USA 87:1816-1819.
 Sokal RR, Oden NL, Wilson C. (1991) "Genetic evidence for the spread of agriculture in Europe by demic diffusion." Nature 351:143-145. 
 Chen J, Sokal RR, Ruhlen M. (1995) "Worldwide analysis of genetic and linguistic relationships of human populations." Human Biology 67:595-612. 
 Barbujani G, Sokal RR, Oden NL. (1995) "Indo-European origins: a computer-simulation test of five hypotheses." American Journal of Physical Anthropology 96:109-132. 
 Sokal R.R., Oden N.L., Rosenberg M.S., Thomson B.A.(2000) "Cancer incidences in Europe related to mortalities, and ethnohistoric, genetic, and geographic distances." Proceedings of the National Academy of Sciences USA 97:6067-6072.

Selected scientific bibliography (books)
 Sokal R.R. and Sneath P.H.E. (1963) Principles of Numerical Taxonomy. Freeman & Co., San Francisco 
 Sneath P.H.E. and Sokal R.R. (1973) Principles of Numerical Taxonomy. Freeman & Co., San Francisco 
 Sokal R.R. and Rohlf F.J. (1987) Introduction to Biostatistics. Freeman & Co., New York 
 Sokal R.R. and Rohlf F.J. (2012) Biometry. 4th ed. Freeman & Co., New York

See also
Caminalcules
Gabriel graph

References

Further reading
 Stefan Schomann: Letzte Zuflucht Schanghai. Die Liebesgeschichte von Robert Reuven Sokal und Julie Chenchu Yang. München: Heyne 2008. . (Paperback: Der große gelbe Fisch. )
 David L. Hull: Science as a Process. An Evolutionary Account of the Social and Conceptual Development of Science. Chicago: University of Chicago Press 1988.

External links
Oral history interview with Robert Sokal, United States Holocaust Memorial Museum Collection, Gift of the Gratz College Holocaust Oral History Archive
National Academy Member Profile
 Michael A. Bell, Robert Reuven Sokal, 1926-2012, Department of Ecology and Evolution, Stony Brook University
 Guido Barbujani, Walking with Robert Sokal, Human Biology, 84(5):481-8 (October 2012) 
 Douglas J. Futuyma, Robert R. Sokal (1926–2012), Science, 336:816 (18 May 2012)
 Michael Bell, Robert Reuven Sokal, 1926-2012, Evolutionary Anthropology, 21:87–88 (2012), on Wiley Online Library
 University obituaries: Robert R. Sokal, The University of Chicago Magazine, Jul-Aug 2012

1926 births
2012 deaths
American anthropologists
American statisticians
Biostatisticians
Jewish American scientists
Jewish emigrants from Austria after the Anschluss
Members of the United States National Academy of Sciences
21st-century American Jews